The Denver District Attorney's Office is responsible for the prosecution of state criminal violations in the Second Judicial District.  Colorado has 64 counties within the 22 judicial districts in the State. The office is composed of approximately 75 attorneys and 125 support staff, who as a whole are responsible for more than 6,000 felony and 17,000 misdemeanor prosecutions annually.  The elected District Attorney is the chief law enforcement officer in the City and County of Denver, and is responsible for the prosecution of violations of Colorado State Laws.  The current Denver District Attorney is Beth McCann.

Mission statement
The Mission of the Denver District Attorney's Office is to professionally and completely prosecute crimes and investigate potential crimes on behalf of the people of the State of Colorado and in doing so, do justice, advocate for victims' rights and advise and consult in the deterrence and prevention of crime; to ensure the open, evenhanded and humane administration of justice.

History 
Denver was originally a city within Arapahoe County until 1902 when the Homerule Amendment was passed by voters.  This amendment to the Constitution of the State of Colorado, located in Article XX, gave limited home rule powers to incorporated Colorado cities of a certain size, enabling the creation of the City and County of Denver with its own separate judicial district.

The Denver District Attorney's Office has a storied history.  One of Denver's first District Attorneys, Isaac Stevens, made a name for himself when he successfully prosecuted Dr. Thatcher Graves for poisoning a patient who was visiting Denver. She became ill and subsequently died after taking some medicine the doctor had mailed to her.  Stevens later became editor and manager of the Colorado Springs Gazette in 1899, and eventually an author. His works include: The Liberators: A Story of Future American Politics (1908), An American Suffragette (1911) and What is Love? (1918).

Robert Wilbur Steele, a member of a prominent pioneer Colorado family, served as District Attorney from 1892 to 1894.  Steele went on to a distinguished judicial career both as a Denver District Court judge as well as presiding judge of the Second Judicial District.  He established a Juvenile Field Day at court, and his successor, Judge Ben B. Lindsey was known as the father of the juvenile court system, and cited Steele as an inspiration.  Steele  was later appointed Chief Justice of the Colorado Supreme Court.

Greeley Whitford, after serving as Denver District Attorney from 1895 to 1896, was appointed United States Attorney for Colorado by President William McKinley.

Ben Lindsley, Denver District Attorney from 1901 to 1904, has a small historical footnote based on a plan he pitched to the Denver Police Chief to rid Denver of Bat Masterson, one-time Sheriff of Arapahoe County, Colorado, after Masterson went on a drunken shooting spree. Masterson subsequently moved to New York City where he gained fame as a boxing promoter and star of dime store novels about western lawmen.

John Rush served as Denver District Attorney from 1913 to 1916, following his legislative service as a state senator.  While serving as a senator, Rush helped pass the 1901 Homerule Amendment, an amendment to the Constitution of the State of Colorado, sometimes referred to as the "Rush Amendment" for his significant support.

Philip S. Van Cise was elected for one term in 1921.  Known as "The Colonel", he used military tactics to bring down gangster Lou Blonger, "The Fixer", and his "Million Dollar Bunco Ring".  Van Cise also took on the Ku Klux Klan at a time when Klan members included the Mayor of Denver and the Governor of Colorado.  Van Cise prosecuted a number of high-profile criminals and exposed the underbelly of the Klan helping loosen the Klan's grip on political power but the fight didn't come cheaply. Van Cise's political career was short – he served only one term – and, his crusade almost cost him his life; he survived two attempts on his life.  Van Cise's book Fighting the Underworld was reportedly used as source material for the motion picture The Sting.

John A. Carroll was elected Denver District Attorney in 1936 and served one four-year term.  He was subsequently appointed to be the United States Attorney for Colorado and served in both the United States House of Representatives and United States Senate for Colorado.

Denver District Attorney Mike McKevitt, who gained a reputation for prosecuting "hippies" in the 1960s, was elected to the United States House of Representatives in 1970 but was defeated after one term. He went on to become an assistant United States attorney general, Office of Legislation, in  1973, and counsel for the Energy Policy Office in The White House from 1973 to 1974.

United Airlines Flight 629
Perhaps the most famous case handled by the office was one of the first plane bombing cases in U.S. history.  In 1955 United Airlines Flight 629 was blown up by a dynamite bomb placed in the checked baggage. Denver District Attorney Bert Keating charged Denver resident John Gilbert Graham with one count of first degree murder for the death of his mother, Daisie Eldora King, 53, who was on the plane.  Graham was the beneficiary of both her will and life insurance. Keating personally handled the prosecution and successfully obtained a confession, conviction and ultimately a death sentence for the defendant.

Overview 
The Denver District Attorney's Office currently employs 75 attorneys and approximately 125 support staff. The office is divided into different divisions and special programs:
The County Court Division: handles over 17,000 cases per year. The case load is primarily alcohol-related traffic offenses, third-degree assault cases and domestic violence cases. 
The District Court Division: handles about 6,000 cases per year, including all felony cases not otherwise routed to specialized crime units (see below).  Cases in District Court are supervised from preliminary hearing through sentencing by the same district court team.

Specialized Prosecution Units consist of prosecutors, victim advocates and investigators with experience and knowledge dealing with specific types of criminal cases. These are:
DUI Court Unit
Family Violence Unit
Economic Crime Unit
Gang Unit
Drug Unit
Juvenile Unit

The Special Programs Unit oversees programs such as:
Juvenile Diversion Program
Victims' Services Network 
Witness Protection Program 
Family Violence Early Intervention Program
Communities Against Senior Exploitation
Volunteer Victim Advocate Program
Courtrooms to Classrooms
Sexual Assault Interagency Council (SAIC)
Justice Review Project

Notable projects

Justice Review Project
In 2010, the Colorado Attorney General's Office partnered with the Denver District Attorney's Office in establishing the Justice Review Project, an ongoing federally funded effort to review post-conviction cases of forcible rape, murder, and non-negligent manslaughter to determine whether biological evidence may exist that might, through DNA analysis, demonstrate actual innocence. 
Although no exonerations resulted from the review of over 5,000 qualifying cases, a great deal was learned about retrospective analysis of cases throughout the course of the project. The lessons learned were in turn applied to creating a more efficient system for post-conviction review, including locating and determining the condition of evidence in cases early on, not holding defendants accountable for the actions of their trial attorneys, and instituting a defendant-initiated application process. This revamped model earned a second round of funding from the National Institute of Justice, and the Justice Review Project II is scheduled to commence in January 2012.

DNA Burglary Project
In 2005, the Denver DNA Burglary Project was launched with a grant from the National Institute of Justice.  Prior to the project, the Denver Police Department responded to more than 7,500 burglary cases a year and property crimes in Denver had increased by approximately 5% annually. While DNA testing has not been routine in property crimes such as burglary, research shows habitual burglars commit on average about 240 burglaries a year. The purpose of the Burglary DNA Project was to identify biological evidence at burglary crime scenes and develop DNA profiles that would help catch and later convict these serial criminals. While the hypothesis was strong, the results were astounding:
510 burglary cases with viable biological material were identified, resulting in 182 criminal cases being filed. 
More than 95 prolific burglars in the Denver area were caught and convicted
The burglary rate in Denver dropped 26%.
Defendants that were convicted with the aid of DNA evidence received an average prison sentence of 14 years.
Annual savings to citizens in Denver are estimated at more than $29 million to date. 
Despite the cost of DNA testing, the return on investment was determined to be 90:1. 
While the Denver DNA Burglary Project has technically ended, the practices developed and lessons learned continue to be implemented to combat this invasive and costly form of crime.

Cold Case Project
In 2005, the Denver Police Department Crime Laboratory and Denver District Attorney's Office were selected by the National Institute of Justice as one of five sites to study the impact of DNA technology and the CODIS database on high volume crimes. To date Denver leads all of the sites in terms of CODIS hits and case filings to the District Attorney's Office.
As of late 2011, Denver has reviewed more than 4,500 unsolved sexual assault and homicide cases that qualified as no suspect cases. More than 1,300 of these cases had possible biological evidence and have been sent to the DPD Crime Laboratory over the past eight years.  The results of the Denver Cold Case Initiative as of October 2011 are as follows:
380 DNA profiles submitted to CODIS
194 CODIS hits (51% hit rate)
81 cases have been filed – sexual assault and homicide cases
77 cases have been adjudicated (including dismissals)
147 "John/Jane Doe" Filings (cases filed on the unique DNA profile  before a name is known)

List of elected Denver district attorneys

References 

Government of Denver
District attorneys in Colorado